Philippine School Doha, also known as PSD for short, is a learning institution in Qatar providing basic education for the Filipino. The school has undergone numerous processes to gain its DepEd recognition, finally receiving it in 2000. In 2011, the school received a prize from the Supreme Education Council as one of the highest achieving international schools in Qatar.

History
The Philippine School Doha was established in October 1992 to serve the educational needs of the children of the Filipino community in the State of Qatar. Its birth was the result of the action of members of the Filipino community in Doha under the auspices of the Philippine Embassy. As required under the laws of the Philippines, the school has been incorporated as a non-stock, non-profit educational corporation and is duly registered as the Philippine School in Doha, Inc. with the Securities and Exchange Commission. As such, the school is governed by the Corporation Code and special laws and regulations of the Philippines.

A special set of regulations for the operation of the PSD as a private school is the MOPAR (Manual of Policies and Regulations). This was drawn up by the IAC (Inter-Agency Committee) of regulatory agencies of the Philippine government, namely, the Department of Labor and Employment. The MOPAR is amplified by the PSD Manual of Norms and Policies approved by the board of trustees in order to manage and operate PSD pursuant to the amended By-laws of the school corporation.

The school is also governed by Amiri Ordinance No. 7 of the year 1980 regarding organization of private schools in the State of Qatar and by applicable regulations of concerned local authorities. In accordance with the general provisions of the said Ordinance, PSD was given permission by the Ministry of Education and Higher Education to operate as a private school of the Filipino community in Qatar, under the patronage of the Philippine Embassy in Doha. The Department of Education Culture and Sports, granted the PSD the permit to operate on March 6, 1997, per Government Permit No. 002, s. 1997. Subsequently, on February 1, 2000, Philippine School Doha was granted recognition by the DECS per Government Recognition No. 001, s. 2000.

In 2016, the school was one of twelve schools excluded from Qatar's education voucher system.

Function
The Philippine School Doha follows the Revised Basic Education Curriculum required by the Qatar Supreme Education Council. Its present principal is Dr. Alexander S. Acosta Ph.D., who came to his current post in 2003.

Students

Mission 
Provide PSDians a well-balanced Student Activity Program to further enhance their total development through co and extra-curricular activities, utilizing student formation tools involving membership to clubs/organization, sports program/varsity, student coordinating body (SSG), school publication, educational outbound program, performing arts troupe and other worthwhile student activities to support the attainment of the PSD vision and mission.

Student Clubs 
The Philippine School Doha's Office of the Student Affairs aims to provide the students a well-balanced Student Activity Program to further enhance their total development through co-curricular and extra-curricular activities based on the centre's vision and mission. The Student Activity Program includes the utilization of student formation tools involving membership to clubs/organization, sports program/varsity, student coordinating body (SSG), school publication, educational outbound program, performing arts troupe and other worthwhile student activities to support the attainment of the Philippine School Doha's vision and mission. See the table below for all the school's co-curricular and extra-curricular clubs and organizations.

School Paper | The Link 
Pursuant to the Republic Act 7079 or the Campus Journalism Act of 1991, the Philippine School Doha promotes campus journalism and freedom of speech through the school paper. The Link, the official publication of Philippine School Doha, serves as the artery that keeps the lifeblood of school life flowing in the stream of responsibility and commitment. It reflects the activities, the needs, the voices and the achievements of the students and the school. The tagline "Beyond the Visionaries' Ink" embodies the paper's aim to uphold the truth through balanced reporting and free expression of ideas, sentiments and opinions. The school paper has regular sections named Campus News, Opinion, Voices Bureau, Editorial, Features, Literary, Entertainment, and Sports.

References
11. https://psd.sch.qa/campus-life/student-government/

Philippine international schools in Asia
Schools in Qatar
International schools in Qatar
Educational institutions established in 1992
1992 establishments in Qatar